Joseph D. Lewis (born 13 January 1989) is an Australian cyclist, who most recently rode for American amateur team Team Clif Bar.

Major results

2007
 Top End Tour
1st Stages 4 & 5
 Brindabella Challenge
1st Stages 1 & 2
2008
 3rd Overall Tour of Bright
2009
 1st Stage 8 Tour of Tasmania
 3rd Overall Tour du New Caledonia
 4th Time trial, Oceania Under-23 Road Championships
2010
 1st Overall Tour of Bright
1st Stage 1
 2nd Tour of Gippsland
 8th Overall Rás Tailteann
2011
 1st Stage 4 Tour of the Gila
 3rd Road race, National Under-23 Road Championships
 7th Overall Herald Sun Tour
2013
 1st Overall Labor Day Omnium
1st Stage 2
 2nd Bucks County Classic
 10th Philadelphia International Cycling Classic
2014
 2nd Winston-Salem Cycling Classic
2015
 3rd Winston-Salem Cycling Classic
 8th Overall Bay Classic Series
2018
 1st  Points classification Colorado Classic

References

External links

1989 births
Living people
Australian male cyclists